Mary Killen is a Northern Irish etiquette expert who writes an "agony" column for The Spectator. She is also the author of several books.

Killen lives in Wiltshire, England, and is married to artist Giles Wood. The couple have been regular participants on the television programme Gogglebox since Series 5 in 2015.

Mary and Giles often address each other as 'nutty'.

Works
 How the Queen Can Make You Happy (2012)
 The Diary of Two Nobodies (2017) by Giles Wood and Mary Killen

References

External links
 'Articles contributed to The Spectator

Living people
Year of birth missing (living people)
Etiquette writers
Writers from Wiltshire
Place of birth missing (living people)
British advice columnists
British women columnists
People from Larne